An ore shoot is a mass of ore deposited in a vein. The ore shoot consists of the most valuable part of the ore deposit. An ore shoot is the area of concentration containing primary ore along the veins present in the rocks.

Veins 
Along an ore shoot, there is a rich gathering of different minerals in a vein. The veins resemble a pipe or a chimney in structure. Veins are displaced mainly vertically oriented but also horizontal with large veins extending approximately  horizontally and  vertically. The metal contents in ore shoots are distributed in areas that vary in deposit sizes.

Sizes and structure 
The circumference of deposit sizes can range from a few meters, to many kilometres.

Locations 
There are complex stratigraphic historical parameters required in understanding how ore shoots are formed. Rocks go through numerous ductile and brittle deformation events before they become mineralized. The different locations of ore shoots in Australia are determined by investigating the internal architecture of the rock pile. The longest shoots occur on the flanks of the basalt flows with the largest lateral extent. The geometry and internal structure of the basalt flows is important for predicting the likelihood and extent of the ore shoots.

References 

Ore deposits

Mining terminology
Geology